= 7/5 =

7/5 may refer to:

- July 5 (month-day date notation)
- May 7 (day-month date notation)
